Awadelphis hirayamai is a species of extinct oceanic river dolphin discovered in the Senhata Formation of Japan dating around 6 million years ago (mya). The genus name derives from Awa, an ancient name for the Chiba Prefecture where the holotype specimen was collected, and Ancient Greek delphis meaning "dolphin"; the species name honors the discoverer of the holotype, Ren Hirayama. It may have inhabited a subpolar environment. Awadelphis and other river dolphins of the Late Miocene may have been in abundance due to the decline of competing ancient dolphins and porpoises.

References

River dolphins
Mammals described in 2015
Pliocene mammals of Asia